Kanarya station was a station on the Istanbul suburban in Küçükçekmece, Istanbul. Located along the eastern shore of Lake Küçükçekmece, it was the second westernmost stop on the line, before Halkalı. The station consisted of an island platform serving two tracks. Kanarya station was opened on 4 December 1955 by the Turkish State Railways as part of the electric commuter rail service from Sirkeci to Halkalı. The station saw its last train of 1 March 2013 and was demolished shortly after. The new Marmaray commuter rail system did not rebuild the station to modern standards, closing down Kanarya after over 57 years of service.

References

Defunct railway stations in Turkey
Railway stations in Istanbul Province
Railway stations opened in 1955
Railway stations closed in 2013
1955 establishments in Turkey
2013 disestablishments in Turkey
Küçükçekmece